Kang Hae-won (born 19 March 1986) is a South Korean badminton player who affiliated with the Samsung Electro-Mechanics team since 2009. She won the bronze medal at the 2004 Asian Junior Championships in the mixed doubles event partnered with Lee Yong-dae, also claimed the silver medal in the girls' team event. Born in Jeju, Kang educated at the Incheon National University, won the 2008 National University Championships in the women's singles and doubles event. At the 55th National Summer Championships in 2012, she claimed triple titles by winning the women's singles, doubles, and team event. Kang was part of the national women's team that won the bronze medal at the 2009 East Asian Games in Hong Kong.

Achievements

Asian Junior Championships 
Mixed doubles

BWF Grand Prix 
The BWF Grand Prix had two levels, the BWF Grand Prix and Grand Prix Gold. It was a series of badminton tournaments sanctioned by the Badminton World Federation (BWF) which was held from 2007 to 2017.

Women's doubles

  BWF Grand Prix Gold tournament
  BWF Grand Prix tournament

IBF International 
Women's doubles

References

External links 
 

1986 births
Living people
Sportspeople from Jeju Province
South Korean female badminton players
21st-century South Korean women